Alexander Outlaw (1738–1826) was an American frontiersman and politician, active in the formation and early history of the State of Tennessee.  A veteran of the American Revolution, he settled on the Appalachian frontier, in what is now Jefferson County, Tennessee, in the early 1780s.  He served simultaneously in the assembly of the failed State of Franklin as well as the legislature of its parent state, North Carolina.  He was a delegate to the North Carolina convention that ratified the United States Constitution in 1789, and to the Tennessee state constitutional convention in 1796.

Outlaw represented Jefferson County in the Tennessee House of Representatives during the First General Assembly (1796). He represented Jefferson in the Tennessee Senate during the Third General Assembly (1799–1801), and was elected Speaker.  After his senate term, he focused primarily on land speculation and law.  He died in Dallas County, Alabama, in 1826.

Rural Mount, a house built by Outlaw for his son-in-law, Joseph Hamilton, still stands near Morristown, Tennessee, and is listed on the National Register of Historic Places.  Outlaw was the grandfather of U.S. Senator Alexander Outlaw Anderson.

References

People from Jefferson County, Tennessee
People from Duplin County, North Carolina
Tennessee state senators
Members of the Tennessee House of Representatives
People of Tennessee in the American Revolution
People from the State of Franklin
1738 births
1826 deaths